Aisha M. Beliso-De Jesús is an American anthropologist, academic, author, and editor. She is Professor of Spanish and Portuguese and American Studies at Princeton University, and the author of Electric Santería: Racial and Sexual Assemblages of Transnational Religion (2015). Beliso-De Jesús is also the editor-in-chief of Transforming Anthropology.

Education 
Beliso-De Jesús received a Bachelor of Arts in Chicano and Latino Studies from University of California, Berkeley. Thereafter, she earned a Master of Arts and a Doctor of Philosophy (PhD) in Cultural and Social Anthropology from Stanford University.

Career 

In July 2009, Beliso-De Jesús joined the Harvard Divinity School (HDS) faculty as assistant professor of African American Religions. She later authored Electric Santería: Racial and Sexual Assemblages of Transnational Religion, which won the 2016 Albert J. Raboteau Award for the Best Book in Africana Religions.

After eight years at HDS, Beliso-De Jesús joined the Princeton University faculty as Professor of Spanish and Portuguese and American Studies. She is also the editor-in-chief of Transforming Anthropology, a journal published by the Association of Black Anthropologists.

Bibliography 
Electric Santería: Racial and Sexual Assemblages of Transnational Religion, Columbia University Press, 2015,

References 

Harvard Divinity School faculty
American women anthropologists
UC Berkeley College of Letters and Science alumni
Stanford University alumni
Living people
Year of birth missing (living people)
American women editors
21st-century American women